"My Moscow" is the municipal anthem of the Russian city of Moscow since 1995. The music was composed in 1941 by Isaak Dunayevsky and the lyrics were written by Sergey Agranyan and Mark Lisyansky.

The original performer was Zoya Rozhdestvenskaya.

The original lyrics had four verses, of which the last pertained to Joseph Stalin. They were replaced by the current lyrics which were introduced during the Leonid Brezhnev era.

Lyrics

Current lyrics since 1995

Brezhnev-era lyrics

Original Stalin-era lyrics

Notes

References

http://www.sovmusic.ru (for the Stalin-era and Brezhnev-era lyrics)
http://www.personal.psu.edu/npi103/mos1_himn.htm (for the English translation)
https://web.archive.org/web/20080604144129/http://www.mos.ru/cgi-bin/pbl_web?vid=1&osn_id=0&subr_unom=1907&datedoc=0 (for the current lyrics)
Self-made transliterations

External links
MP3 Vocal and instrumental recordings of the current anthem
A Brezhnev-era MP3 vocal recording
A Stalin-era MP3 vocal recording
"My Moscow" - korean version
"My Moscow" - chinese version

1941 songs
Culture in Moscow
20th century in Moscow
Russian anthems
Songs about Moscow
Compositions by Isaak Dunayevsky
Soviet songs